Mixed Group is a parliamentary group active in both houses of the Italian Parliament, the Chamber of Deputies and the Senate.

Mixed Group may also refer to:
Mnet Asian Music Award for Best Mixed Group
Mixed Group,  a permanent parliamentary group in Spain's Board of Spokespersons